The Robe is a 1953 American fictional Biblical epic film that tells the story of a Roman military tribune who commands the unit that is responsible for the Crucifixion of Jesus. The film was released by 20th Century Fox and was the first film released in the widescreen process CinemaScope. Like other early CinemaScope films, The Robe was shot with Henri Chrétien's original Hypergonar anamorphic lenses.

The film was directed by Henry Koster and produced by Frank Ross. The screenplay was adapted by Gina Kaus, Albert Maltz, and Philip Dunne — although Maltz's place among the blacklisted Hollywood 10 led to his being denied his writing credit for many years — from Lloyd C. Douglas's 1942 novel. The score was composed by Alfred Newman, and the cinematography was by Leon Shamroy.

The film stars Richard Burton, Jean Simmons, Victor Mature and Michael Rennie, and co-stars Dean Jagger, Jay Robinson, Richard Boone and Jeff Morrow. The 1954 sequel, Demetrius and the Gladiators, picks up exactly where The Robe ends.

Plot
Roman tribune Marcellus Gallio, on the way to a gladiator auction, helps catch runaway defiant Greek slave Demetrius, then at the auction site is reunited with childhood love Diana (now ward of Emperor Tiberius), who has been pledged in marriage to the regent Caligula, with whom Marcellus has a longstanding feud. Marcellus outbids Caligula in an auction for Demetrius, whom Marcellus wins and sets free, yet Demetrius remains honor bound to Marcellus and becomes his household servant. That evening, Caligula vengefully assigns Marcellus a military transfer to Jerusalem; before Marcellus leaves, he and Diana pledge their love and reaffirm their promise from youth to one day marry, as Diana will not allow her marriage to Caligula.

Accompanied by Demetrius and centurion Paulus, Marcellus arrives in Jerusalem on the same day Jesus, a man hailed as the Messiah, enters the city. Demetrius feels compelled to follow this man and later learns of the plot to arrest him; he attempts to warn Jesus but is told by a distraught man that he has already been arrested. Demetrius implores Marcellus to intercede, but the procurator Pontius Pilate has already condemned Jesus to death and orders Marcellus to take charge of the crucifixion.

Shortly after the crucifixion, Marcellus wins Jesus's robe from Paulus in a dice game on Calvary, but when he uses it to shield himself from rain, it causes him sudden, intense pain. Demetrius denounces Marcellus and the Roman Empire and leaves with the robe. Marcellus, now haunted by nightmares of the crucifixion, reports back to Tiberius at Capri, where the emperor's soothsayer says that the robe is cursed and has begun to work its dark magic. Tiberius gives Marcellus an imperial commission to find and destroy the robe as well as the followers of Jesus. At Diana's request, Tiberius leaves her free to marry Marcellus, provided he successfully returns from his commission and cures himself of his madness.

Marcellus travels to Cana, whose inhabitants believe Jesus has risen from the dead. Marcellus learns from a weaver, Justus, that Demetrius has arrived at the village and confronts him at an inn, where he is unable to destroy the robe. Demetrius says the robe has no real power and it is Marcellus' guilt over killing an innocent man that has caused his troubles. Justus is killed by Paulus, who informs Marcellus that Caligula has succeeded Tiberius as emperor and his original orders are no longer valid. Marcellus defeats Paulus in a duel and is invited by the fisherman Simon Peter to join Demetrius and him as missionaries. After confessing his role in Jesus' death, Marcellus pledges his life to Jesus and their missionary journey takes them to Rome, where Caligula has proscribed them.

In Rome, Caligula informs Diana that Marcellus has become a traitor to Rome by indulging his madness and proceeds to have Demetrius captured and tortured. The slave Marcipor helps reunite Marcellus and Diana, who attempt to rescue Demetrius, but he is mortally wounded through torture. Demetrius is brought to the house of Gallio where he is healed by Peter, and Marcellus' father disowns his son as an enemy of Rome. Caligula, learning that Demetrius was rescued, orders Marcellus to be brought before him to stand trial. Marcellus and Demetrius attempt to flee but Marcellus gives himself up so Demetrius can escape. Diana visits Marcellus in his holding cell and pleads with him to say what is necessary during his trial, but Marcellus will not deny Jesus.

At his trial, Marcellus admits to being a follower of Jesus but denies that he and his friends are plotting against the state. Caligula condemns Marcellus to death unless he denounces his beliefs that Jesus is the son of God and rose from the dead, but Marcellus defies him. Diana stands with Marcellus and denounces Caligula, who condemns Diana to die alongside Marcellus. As they depart the audience hall for their execution, Marcellus is pitied by his forlorn father and Diana gives the robe to Marcipor. The two are led from the hall and prepare for an eternal life together in heaven.

Historical inaccuracies
Despite the careful attention to Roman history and culture displayed in the film, some inaccuracies are included: in reality, Emperor Tiberius' wife, Julia, who had been banished from Rome by her father Augustus years before Tiberius acceded to the imperial throne, was already dead.

Caligula did not systematically persecute Christians, as indicated in the movie (Roman soldiers killing Justus in Cana). The first persecution of Christians organized by the Roman government was under the emperor Nero in 64 AD after the Great Fire of Rome and took place entirely within the city of Rome.

Cast

Credited
 Richard Burton as Marcellus Gallio
 Jean Simmons  as Diana
 Victor Mature as Demetrius
 Michael Rennie as Peter
 Jay Robinson as Caligula
 Dean Jagger as Justus
 Torin Thatcher  as Senator Gallio
 Richard Boone  as Pontius Pilate
 Betta St. John as Miriam
 Jeff Morrow  as Paulus
 Ernest Thesiger as Tiberius
 Dawn Addams  as Junia
 Leon Askin  as Abidor

Uncredited
 Michael Ansara as Judas
 Helen Beverley  as Rebecca
 Sally Corner as Cornelia Gallio
 Rosalind Ivan as Empress Julia the Elder
 Donald C. Klune as Jesus of Nazareth
 David Leonard as Marcipor
 Cameron Mitchell as the voice of Jesus
 Jay Novello as Tiro
 Frank Pulaski  as Quintus
 Pamela Robinson as Lucia Gallio
 Harry Shearer as David

Background and production
Frank Ross acquired the rights to the novel in 1942, before it was completed for $100,000.

The Robe was originally announced for filming by RKO in the 1940s and was set to be directed by Mervyn LeRoy, but the rights were eventually sold to Twentieth Century Fox. Ross received $40,000 plus 20% of the profits. RKO received $300,000 plus $650,000 from future profits.

Jeff Chandler was originally announced for the role of Demetrius. Victor Mature signed in December 1952 to make both The Robe and a sequel about Demetrius. John Buckmaster tested for the role of Caligula.

Filming finished on April 30, 1953, two weeks ahead of schedule.

The film was advertised as "the modern miracle you see without glasses", a dig at the 3D movies of the day. Since many theaters of the day were not equipped to show a CinemaScope film, two versions of The Robe were made: one in the standard screen ratio of the day, the other in the widescreen process. Setups and some dialogue differ between the versions. The film was usually shown on television using the standard 1.33:1 aspect ratio version that fills a standard television screen rather than the CinemaScope version. American Movie Classics may have been the first to offer telecasts of the widescreen version.  Recent DVDs and Blu-ray Discs of the film, however, present the film in the original widescreen format, as well as the multitrack stereophonic soundtrack.

Reception

Critical reception
Critical reaction of the film and CinemaScope following the premiere in New York was generally favourable. Frank Quinn of the New York Daily Mirror called it: "a new realistic and phenomenal concept of the art of motion picture production." Kate Cameron at the New York Daily News gave it eight stars (four for the film and four for CinemaScope) and claimed that "any picture projected on a flat screen...is going to seem dull" after The Robe. The only criticism came from Bosley Crowther of The New York Times who wrote: "The human drama of this story of Christian conversion occurs amid sumptuous and scenic surroundings and are mighty impressive to see. But the mightiness of surroundings—the spectacle of settings and costumes—is meaningful only in relation to the story that is being told. And the story in this instance is not spectacular, so that the amplitude of its surroundings does not enhance its scope." Variety wrote: "It is a 'big' picture in every sense of the word. One magnificent scene after another, under the anamorphic technique, unveils the splendor that was Rome and the turbulence that was Jerusalem at the time of Christ on Calvary."

Edwin Schallert of the Los Angeles Times stated that the film was in "a class that is unique, deeply spiritual and even awe-inspiring." Richard L. Coe of The Washington Post wrote: "Partly through the writing, partly through the variety of acting styles, this reverence does not stir the emotions. It is very hard to take seriously a film which presents so petulantly obvious a performance as Jay Robinson's sophomoric Caligula or a script which early observes: 'You have made me the laughing stock of Rome.' These and matters like them are not aspects of fine motion picture making." Harrison's Reports declared: "Excellent! Even if it had been produced in the conventional 2-D form, Lloyd C. Douglas' powerful novel of the birth of Christianity in the days of ancient Rome would have made a great picture, but having been produced in the revolutionary CinemaScope process, it emerges as not only a superior dramatic achievement but also as a spectacle that will electrify audiences with its overpowering scope and magnitude." The Monthly Film Bulletin called it "a routine addition to the numerous Hollywood Biblical films", presenting "a characteristically distorted and simplified view of Imperial Rome, with a ranting Caligula, a doddering Tiberius, and the customary scenes of 'spectacle' in the palace, the market-place and the torture chamber. The performances lack enthusiasm, and Richard Burton in particular seems ill at ease as the morose Marcellus." Basil Wright wrote in Sight & Sound: "As a film on a religious subject, Henry Koster's The Robe has rather fewer lapses in taste than most of its predecessors. If the actual speaking of Christ's cry from the Cross is a major error, it is not multiplied. In general, the subject is treated with reasonable reverence and is a deal better than Quo Vadis, which was a perfect illustration of Aristotle's remark about the ludicrous being merely a sub-division of the ugly."

Based on 21 reviews, the film holds a score of 38% on Rotten Tomatoes.

Box office
The film premiered at the Roxy Theatre in New York City on September 16, 1953. On its public release the following day, it set a record one-day gross (for a single theatre) of $36,000. It set a one-week record gross (for a single theatre) of $264,427.

It earned an estimated $17.5 million in North America during its initial theatrical release. Its worldwide rentals were estimated at $32 million.

Awards and honors
26th Academy Awards:
Wins
 Best Art Direction (Color): Art Direction: Lyle R. Wheeler, George Davis; Set Decoration: Walter M. Scott, Paul S. Fox
 Best Costume Design (Color): Charles LeMaire, Emile Santiago
Nominations
 Best Motion Picture: Frank Ross, Producer
 Best Actor: Richard Burton
 Best Cinematography (Color): Leon Shamroy

11th Golden Globe Awards:
Wins
 Best Motion Picture – Drama

Others
The film is recognized by American Film Institute in these lists:
 2005: AFI's 100 Years of Film Scores – Nominated
 2006: AFI's 100 Years...100 Cheers – Nominated
 2008: AFI's 10 Top 10:
 Nominated Epic Film

First telecast
ABC paid a record $2 million for the television rights, sponsored by Ford, for four screenings in the United States. The film was first telecast on Easter weekend on Sunday 26, March 1967, at the relatively early hour of 7:00 P.M., EST, to allow for family viewing. In a highly unusual move, the film was shown with only one commercial break – a luxury not even granted to the then-annual telecasts of The Wizard of Oz. The film received a Nielsen rating of 31.0 and an audience share of 53%, with the second largest TV audience for a film, behind The Bridge on the River Kwai, with 60 million viewers.

Home media
The film was released on VHS and DVD on October 16, 2001. It was released on Blu-ray on March 17, 2009.

Soundtrack
 When the original soundtrack album was issued on LP by Decca Records, it used a remix for only monaural sound rather than the stereo sound that was originally recorded.  
 MCA, which acquired the rights to the American Decca recordings, issued an electronic stereo version of the mono tape. 
 RCA Victor included a suite from the film, recorded in Dolby surround sound, in its album Captain from Castile, which honored longtime Fox musical director Alfred Newman (composer of The Robe'''s musical score.)
 Charles Gerhardt conducted London's National Philharmonic Chorus. 
 In 2003, Varèse Sarabande released a two-CD set of the original stereophonic recording on its club label.

Poster
The elaborate poster for the film has one glaring flaw. The woman's face is not Jean Simmons. Originally, Jean Peters had been cast as Diana, but became pregnant. Simmons was hired to replace her. But the poster was not changed, and shows the wrong Jean.

Sequel
The film's successful and highly praised sequel, Demetrius and the Gladiators (1954), featured Victor Mature in the title role. Demetrius and the Gladiators begins with Caligula's challenge to Marcellus and Diana as they climb the stairs to their execution. Filming was completed before The Robe was released.

Preservation
The Academy Film Archive preserved The Robe in 2008.

Popular culture
In the first episode "Openings" of The Queen's Gambit'' miniseries, the film is playing for the staff and wards of the Mathuen orphanage, and the final chorus of Alleluia provides a diegetic source of music while Beth breaks into the dispensary and overdoses.

References

External links

 
 
 
 
 

1953 films
20th Century Fox films
American epic films
Best Drama Picture Golden Globe winners
CinemaScope films
Films about Christianity
Cultural depictions of Tiberius
Cultural depictions of Judas Iscariot
Cultural depictions of Pontius Pilate
Depictions of Caligula on film
Film portrayals of Jesus' death and resurrection
Films based on American novels
Films directed by Henry Koster
Films scored by Alfred Newman
Films set in Rome
Films that won the Best Costume Design Academy Award
Films whose art director won the Best Art Direction Academy Award
Films with screenplays by Philip Dunne
Religious epic films
1950s English-language films
1950s American films